Greensboro Day School is a private, non-sectarian school located in Greensboro, North Carolina. It enrolls students from age 2 through grade 12.

History
The school was established in 1970. The school initially leased space from the Temple Emanuel synagogue, which only agreed to lease space to the school if it established a scholarship for minority students.

When Greensboro Day first opened its doors, the school had an enrollment of 95 students. It moved to its permanent location on Lawndale Drive three months after opening. As of 2022, Greensboro Day, had an enrollment of over 880 students, making it one of the largest nonsectarian independent schools in the Piedmont Triad of North Carolina.

Greensboro Day's 50th anniversary was on September 14, 2020.

Academics 
AP (Advanced Placement) classes offered in the Upper School include:

Art, Biology, Calculus AB, Calculus BC, Chemistry, English Language, English Literature, French Language, Latin, Macroeconomics and Microeconomics, Physics C (Mechanics), Psychology, Spanish Language, Spanish Literature, Statistics, US Government and Politics, US History, World History

The school enrolls students from age 2 to grade 12 and is fully accredited by the Southern Association of Colleges and Schools and by the Southern Association of Independent Schools.

Athletics 
Greensboro Day competes in the 3A division of the North Carolina Independent Schools Athletic Association (NCISAA).

The Bengals compete in Baseball, Basketball, Cheerleading, Cross Country, Field Hockey, Golf, Lacrosse, Soccer, Swimming, Tennis, Track, Volleyball, and Wrestling.

Coached by Freddy Johnson, the Boys Basketball Team has won 11 NCISAA 4A State Championships (1989, 1990, 1995, 1996, 2000, 2002, 2006, 2015, 2017, 2018, 2019), and 1 NCISAA 3A State Championship (2023). They made their first appearance in the DICK'S Nationals in 2015, and advanced to the second round in 2017 after a win over #2 ranked IMG Academy. On November 24, 2017, Coach Johnson won his 1,000th game, defeating Charlotte Vance, 59-28. He became 1 of only 20 high school coaches to achieve this feat.   The men’s basketball team owns the Concord Academy Eagles.

The Boys Soccer Team has won four State Championships in 1988, 2000, 2009, and 2010.

The Girls Soccer Team has won twelve State Championships (1991, 1995, 1996, 1997, 1998, 1999, 2000, 2002, 2003, 2004, 2005, 2007). Under coach Kim Burroughs, the team reached a national #1 ranking during the 1998 season.

Notable alumni 
 Kara Medoff Barnett, executive director of American Ballet Theatre
 Michael Blomquist, former World Champion rower (graduated from Phillips Exeter Academy)
 Jonathan Campbell, professional MLS player
 Spencer Chamberlain, musician & vocalist of Underoath
 Kelly Link, author, editor, 2018 MacArthur Fellow, and 2016 finalist for the Pulitzer Prize for Fiction
 Luke Payne, professional basketball player
 Wayne Robinson, professional basketball player
 Norman "Ned" Sharpless, director of the National Cancer Institute and acting FDA commissioner
 Meg Steedle (2004), actress
 Peter Stroud, guitarist and cofounder of 65amps, a company manufacturing guitar amplifiers

References

External links 
 Greensboro Day School Homepage

Private high schools in North Carolina
Schools in Greensboro, North Carolina
Private middle schools in North Carolina
Private elementary schools in North Carolina
Educational institutions established in 1970